"One and All (We Are)" is the second single from The Smashing Pumpkins' tenth album Monuments to an Elegy. The track premiered through Huffington Post on November 5, 2014.

Recording and sound
In an interview with the Huffington Post, band leader Billy Corgan said "I basically sang the whole song the first time I wrote it... It had written itself." Rolling Stone described the track as having "a deep wash of grungy guitar distortion ...the hard-rocking "One and All" features the drumming of Mötley Crüe's Tommy Lee bashing his way through Billy Corgan and Jeff Schroeder's murky mires of guitar and the singer's lyrics about feeling young."

Reception
The song was favorably received. Stereogum said "The brand new, guitar-overloaded “One and All” is a considerable improvement on “Being Beige,” in my opinion — it’s considerably heavier, too, which plays to Billy Corgan’s strengths at this point in his career." Music Times stated that "Fans of the Pumpkins will not be disappointed, as the song has a darkly metallic quality reminiscent of their 1995 opus Mellon Collie and the Infinite Sadness."Spin.com stated "The new track isn't quite a return to the Pumpkins' glory days, but "One and All" does boast a shoegaze-set-on-overdrive sheen."

Personnel
The Smashing Pumpkins
Billy Corgan – vocals, guitar, bass, keyboards and synthesizers
Jeff Schroeder – guitar

Additional musicians
Tommy Lee – drums

Charts

References

2014 songs
Songs written by Billy Corgan
The Smashing Pumpkins songs
Song recordings produced by Billy Corgan
2014 singles
Noise rock songs